Noah Meisel (1891–1956) was a Jewish Bundist politician and doctor in Latvia. He was born in Nesvizh in the Minsk Governorate of the Russian Empire (now Belarus). He worked in the Latvian Department of Health. Meisel, also a Daugavpils city council member, was elected for the Bund in the three first Latvian Parliament in 1922, 1925 and 1928, but was not reelected in 1931.

Meisel was arrested and deported by the Soviet authorities after the Soviet occupation of Latvia in 1940. He died in Northern Russia in 1956.

References

1891 births
1956 deaths
People from Nesvizh
People from Slutsky Uyezd
Belarusian Jews
Jewish Latvian politicians
"Bund" in Latvia politicians
Deputies of the 1st Saeima
Deputies of the 2nd Saeima
Deputies of the 3rd Saeima
Latvian people who died in Soviet detention